Alex Michel Bjurberg Kessidis (born 23 March 1995) is a Swedish Greco-Roman wrestler. He is a silver medalist at the 2019 World Wrestling Championships and a bronze medalist at the 2020 European Wrestling Championships and the 2019 European Games. He represented Sweden at the 2020 Summer Olympics in Tokyo, Japan.

Early life 

Kessidis and his brother Laokratis Kessidis, also a Greco-Roman wrestler, were born and raised in Sweden by a Greek father and a Swedish mother. In wrestling competitions his brother has chosen to represent Greece whereas Kessidis represents Sweden.

Career 

He competed in the 80 kg event at the 2016 World Wrestling Championships held in Budapest, Hungary and in the same event at the 2017 World Wrestling Championships held in Paris, France. The following year, he competed in the 77 kg event at the 2018 European Wrestling Championships held in Kaspiysk, Russia. In the same year, he reached the semi-finals in the 77 kg event at the 2018 World Wrestling Championships held in Budapest, Hungary where he lost against Aleksandr Chekhirkin of Russia. He then also lost his bronze medal match against Viktor Nemeš of Serbia.

He won the silver medal at the 77 kg event at the 2019 World Wrestling Championships held in Nur-Sultan, Kazakhstan. In the same year, he also competed at the 2019 European Games held in Minsk, Belarus and he won one of the bronze medals in the 77 kg event.

In 2020, he won one of the bronze medals in the 77 kg event at the European Wrestling Championships held in Rome, Italy. In his bronze medal match he defeated Volodymyr Yakovliev of Ukraine.

In January 2021, he won the gold medal in the 82 kg event at the 2021 Grand Prix Zagreb Open held in Zagreb, Croatia. In April 2021, he was eliminated in his second match in the 82 kg event at the European Wrestling Championships in Warsaw, Poland. In June 2021, he won one of the bronze medals in his event at the 2021 Wladyslaw Pytlasinski Cup held in Warsaw, Poland.

He competed in the 77 kg event at the 2020 Summer Olympics held in Tokyo, Japan where he was eliminated in his first match by Rafig Huseynov of Azerbaijan. Two months after the Olympics, he lost his bronze medal match in the 82 kg event at the 2021 World Wrestling Championships held in Oslo, Norway.

In 2022, he competed at the Matteo Pellicone Ranking Series held in Rome, Italy. He lost his bronze medal match in the 87kg event at the 2022 World Wrestling Championships held in Belgrade, Serbia.

Achievements

References

External links 

 

Living people
1995 births
Place of birth missing (living people)
Swedish people of Greek descent
Swedish male sport wrestlers
World Wrestling Championships medalists
European Games bronze medalists for Sweden
Greek people of Swedish descent
Wrestlers at the 2019 European Games
European Games medalists in wrestling
European Wrestling Championships medalists
Wrestlers at the 2020 Summer Olympics
Olympic wrestlers of Sweden
21st-century Swedish people